Kharino is a rural locality (a village) in Asovskoye Rural Settlement, Beryozovsky District, Perm Krai, Russia. The population was 16 as of 2010. There are 3 streets.

Geography 
Kharino is located 34 km southeast of  Beryozovka, the district's administrative centre, by road. Makaryata is the nearest rural locality.

References 

Rural localities in Beryozovsky District, Perm Krai